Saci (Brazilian) – One-legged nature spirit
 Sagari (Japanese) – Horse head that dangles from trees on Kyūshū
 Sakabashira (Japanese) – Haunted pillar, installed upside-down
 Salamander (Alchemy) – Fire elemental
 Samebito (Japanese) – Shark-man servant of the dragon king of the sea
 Samodiva (Slavic) – Nature spirit
 Sampati (Hindu) – The demigod Jatayu's brother
 Sandman (Northern Europe) – Nursery spirit that induces sleep in children
 Sango (South Western Nigeria) – Yoruba king of arts, music, dance and entertainment
 Santelmo (Philippine) –  Spirits in the form of fireballs that roam around the forest
 Santa Claus (North Pole-European folklore) – Elderly man who delivers gifts to well-behaved children on the night of Christmas Eve
 Sânziană (Romanian) – Nature spirit
 Sarimanok (Philippine) – Bird of good fortune
 Sarngika (Hindu) – Bird spirit
 Sarugami (Japanese) – Wicked monkey spirit who was defeated by a dog
 Satori (Japanese) – Mind-reading humanoid
 Satan (Heaven-Abrahamic mythology) – Ruler of Hell
 Satyr (Greek) – Human-goat hybrid and fertility spirit
 Satyrus (Medieval Bestiary) – Apes who always bear twins, one the mother loves, the other it hates
 Sazae-oni (Japanese) – Shapeshifting turban snail spirit
 Sceadugenga (English) – Shapeshifting undead
 Scitalis (Medieval Bestiaries) – Snake which mesmerizes its prey
 Scorpion Man (Sumerian) – Human-scorpion hybrid
 Scylla (Greek) – Human-snake hybrid with a snake's tail, twelve legs, and six long-necked snake heads
 Sea-bee (Heraldic) – Fish-tailed bee
 Sea-lion
 Sea monk (Medieval folklore) – Fish-like humanoid
 Sea monster (Worldwide) – Giant, marine animals
 Sea serpent (Worldwide) – Serpentine sea monster
 Sea-Wyvern (Heraldic) – Fish-tailed wyvern
 Seko (Japanese) – Water spirit which can be heard making merry at night
 Selkie (Faroese, Icelandic, Irish, and Scottish) – Human-seal shapeshifter
 Senpoku-Kanpoku (Japanese) – Human-faced frog which guides newly deceased souls to the graveyard
 Seps (Medieval Bestiaries) – Snake with corrosive venom
 Serpent (Worldwide) – Snake spirit
 Serpopard (Ancient Egypt) – Serpent-leopard hybrid
 Shachihoko (Japanese) – Tiger-carp hybrid
 Shade (Worldwide) – Spiritual imprint
 Shadow People (American) – Malevolent ghost 
 Shahbaz (Persian) – Giant eagle or hawk
 Shaitan (Islam) – Islamic version of the Devil (Satan) from the Bible
 Shang-Yang (Chinese) – Rain bird
 Shedim (Jewish) – Chicken-legged demon
 Shedu (Akkadian and Sumerian) – Protective spirit who takes the form of a winged bull or human-headed lion
 Shellycoat (English, Scottish and German, as schellenrocc) – Water spirit
 Shen (Chinese) – Shapeshifing sea monster
 Shenlong (Chinese) – Weather dragon
 Shibaten (Japanese) – Water spirit from Shikoku
 Shikigami (Japanese) – Servant spirit
 Shiki-ōji (Japanese) – Child-sized servant spirit
 Shikome (Japanese) – Underworld hag
 Shinigami (Japanese) – "Death god"
 Shiro-bōzu (Japanese) – White, faceless spirit
 Shirouneri (Japanese) – Animated mosquito netting or dust cloth
 Shiryō (Japanese) – Spirit of a dead person
 Shisa (Japanese) – Lion-dog hybrid
 Shishi (Chinese) – Protective animal
 Shōjō (Japanese) – Red-haired sea-sprites who love alcohol
 Shōkera (Japanese) – Creature that peers in through skylights
 Shtriga (Albanian) – Vampire witch that feeds on children 
 Shui Gui (Chinese) – Drowned ghost
 Shug Monkey (English) – Dog/monkey
 Shunoban (Japanese) – Red-faced ghoul
 Shuten-dōji (Japanese) – Ruler of the Oni
 Sídhe – (Irish and Scottish) – Ancestral or nature spirit
 Sigbin (Philippine) – Goat-like vampire
 Sileni (Greek) – Bald, fat, thick-lipped, and flat-nosed followers of Dionysus
 Simargl (Slavic) – Winged dog
 Simurgh (Persian) – Dog-lion-peacock hybrid
 Singa (Batak) – Feline animal
 Sint Holo (Choctaw) – Serpentine rain spirit
 Siren (Greek) – Human-bird hybrid
 Sirin (Slavic) – Demonic human-headed bird
 Sirrush (Akkadian) – Dragon with aquiline hind legs and feline forelegs
 Sisiutl (American Indian) – Two-headed sea serpent
 Si-Te-Cah (Paiute) – Red-haired giants
 Sjörå (Norse) – Freshwater spirit
 Sjövættir (Norse) – Sea spirit
 Skin-walker (American Indian) – Animal-human shapeshifter
 Skogsrå (Scandinavian) – Forest spirit
 Sköll (Norse) – Wolf that chases the Sun
 Skookum (Chinook Jargon) – Hairy giant
 Skeleton (Medieval folklore) – Living skeletons
 Skrzak (Slavic) – Household spirit
 Sky Women (Polish) – Weather spirit
 Sleipnir (Norse) – Eight-legged horse
 Sluagh (Irish and Scottish) – Restless ghost
 Snow Lion (Tibetan) – Celestial animal 
 Sodehiki-kozō (Japanese) – Invisible spirit which pulls on sleeves
 Sōgenbi (Japanese) – Fiery ghost of an oil-stealing monk
 Soragami (Japanese) – Ritual disciplinary demon
 Soraki-gaeshi (Japanese) – Sound of trees being cut down, when later none seem to have been cut
 Sorobanbōzu (Japanese) – Ghost with an abacus
 Sōtangitsune (Japanese) – Fox spirit from Kyoto
 Soucouyant (Trinidad and Tobago) – Vampiric hag who takes the form of a fireball at night
 Spearfinger (Cherokee) – Sharp-fingered hag
 Spectre (Worldwide) – Terrifying ghost
 Sphinx (Greek) – Winged woman-headed lion
 Spiriduş (Romanian) – Little people
 Spirit – Ghosts
 Spriggan (Cornish) – Guardians of graveyards and ruins
 Sprite (Medieval folklore) – little people, ghosts or elves
 Squonk (American) – Ugly and lonely creature capable of evading capture by dissolving itself into a pool of tears
 Stihi (Albanian) – Demonic dragon who guards a treasure
 Strigoi (Romanian) – Vampire
 Strix (Roman) – Vampiric bird
 Struthopodes (Medieval Bestiaries) – Humanoid whose males have enormous feet, and females have tiny feet
 Strzyga (Slavic) – Vampiric undead
 Stuhać (Slavic) – Malevolent mountain spirit
 Stymphalian Bird (Greek) – Metallic bird
 Suangi (New Guinea) – Cannibalistic sorcerer
 Succubus (Medieval folklore) – Female night-demon
 Sudice (Slavic) – Fortune spirit
 Sunakake-baba (Japanese) – Sand-throwing hag
 Sunekosuri (Japanese) – Small dog- or cat-like creature that rubs against a person's legs at night
 Surma (Finnish) – Hellhound
 Suzaku (Japanese) – Japanese version of the Chinese Vermillion Bird
 Svaðilfari (Norse) – Unnatural strong horse, father of Sleipnir
 Svartálfar (Norse) – Cavern spirits; the Black Elves
 The Swallower (Ancient Egyptian) – Crocodile-leopard-hippopotamus hybrid
 Swan maiden (Worldwide) – Swan-human shapeshifter
 Sylph (Alchemy) – Air elemental
 Sylvan (Medieval folklore) – Forest spirit
 Syrbotae (Medieval Bestiaries) – African giant
 Syrictæ (Medieval Bestiaries) – Reptilian humanoid

S